This list consists of players who have appeared in Negro league baseball.
 List of Negro league baseball players (A–D)
List of Negro league baseball players (E–L)
List of Negro league baseball players (M–R)
List of Negro league baseball players (S–Z)

A

B

C

D

References 

Negro
 A